The Caecilii Metelli were one of the most important families of the late Roman Republic.  They rose to prominence in the beginning of the third century, with the consulship of Lucius Caecilius Metellus Denter in 284 BC.  It was however Quintus Caecilius Metellus, consul in 143, who greatly improved the prestige of the family, notably thanks to his victory during the Fourth Macedonian War, for which he received the agnomen Macedonicus.  His descendants and those of his younger brother Lucius received an astonishing number of magistracies during the last century of the Republic.

As the most powerful family in Roman politics, the Metelli distinguished themselves by their unwavering support of the Optimates, the conservative faction that opposed the social reforms advocated by the Populares.  Their defeat during the Civil War against Julius Caesar abruptly ended their influence.

Stemma
The overall structure of the stemma is taken from the one drawn by Münzer in the Realencyclopädie, which has recently been reproduced by Karl-J. Hölkeskamp.  T. P. Wiseman made some important corrections in two articles on the descendants of Balearicus and the later Metelli, which have been included. 

The nomen Caecilius is omitted for all the men named Metellus.  All dates are BC, except stated otherwise.  Numbers in brackets indicates the order of marriages. Dotted lines show adoptions.

References

Bibliography
 T. Robert S. Broughton, The Magistrates of the Roman Republic, American Philological Association, 1952–1960.
 August Pauly, Georg Wissowa, Friedrich Münzer, et alii, Realencyclopädie der Classischen Altertumswissenschaft (abbreviated PW), J. B. Metzler, Stuttgart, 1894–1980.
 Christopher Smith, Kaj Sandberg (editors), Omnium Annalium Monumenta: Historical Writing and Historical Evidence in Republican Rome, Leiden & Boston, Brill, 2017.
 T. P. Wiseman, "The Last of the Metelli", Latomus, T. 24, Fasc. 1 (Jan. 1965), pp. 52–61.
 ——, "Celer and Nepos", The Classical Quarterly, 2, Vol. 21, No. 1 (May, 1971), pp. 180–182.

Ancient Roman family trees